Shotgun Banjo is a 1992 Philippine action film starring Zoren Legaspi and Ruffa Gutierrez

Cast

Zoren Legaspi as Banjo
Ruffa Gutierrez as Kara
Miguel Rodriguez as Marvin
Paquito Diaz as Gordon
Jess Lapid Jr.
Ernie Zarate
Romeo Rivera as Dante
Lucita Soriano as Businesswoman Owner
Cris Daluz as Businessman Owner
Manjo Del Mundo
Rommel Valdez as Rocky Turko
Subas Herrero as Atty. Davao
Charlie Davao as Atty. Agustin 
Rachel Lobangco as Lucy
Terence Baylon as Young Banjo
Lester Llansang as Young Marvin
Melissa Mendez
Orestes Ojeda
Max Laurel
Ernie David
Jimmy Reyes
Nonoy De Guzman
Renato del Prado
Roland Montes
Vic Belaro
Aris Bautista

References

External links
 

1992 films
Philippine action films
Regal Entertainment films
Films directed by Joey del Rosario